Atlantic Airlines was an airline based in Nicaragua's capital city, Managua. It was a scheduled and charter airline, established in 1997 and operating domestic and international flights in Central America. Its main base was Managua International Airport.  The airline ceased operations in 2007.

Destinations 

Managua - Bluefields - Daily 
Bluefields - Managua - Daily 
Bluefields - Big Corn Island - Daily
Big Corn Island - Bluefields - Daily 
Managua - Puerto Cabezas - Daily 
Puerto Cabezas - Managua - Daily

Fleet 

The Atlantic Airlines fleet includes the following aircraft (at March 2007):

5 Let L-410 UVP-E
1 Let L-410 UVP-E20

References

External links

 at the Wayback Machine

Defunct airlines of Nicaragua
Airlines established in 1997
Companies based in Managua